Chamanthedon gaudens is a moth of the family Sesiidae described by Walter Rothschild in 1911. It is known from eastern Peru.

References

Sesiidae
Moths described in 1911